Can't Cook, Won't Cook is a British cooking game show that aired on BBC1 from 20 November 1995 to 7 July 2000.

Format
Two people, one of whom can't cook and one of whom won't cook, were nominated to appear on the show and under the instruction of a celebrity/world class chef prepare and cook a meal. When the dish was cooked, the nominator would be blindfolded and asked to taste the food. Following this, they would decide whose dish was best. In the event of a tie, the aforementioned chef would decide.

Then once the winner has been decided the walls of the studio open up to reveal a prize (usually a food blender or set of saucepans).

Transmissions

References

External links

Can't Cook, Won't Cook at BFI

BBC television game shows
1990s British game shows
2000s British game shows
1990s British cooking television series
2000s British cooking television series
1995 British television series debuts
2000 British television series endings
British cooking television shows
Television series by Banijay